Birmingham New Street, also known as New Street station, is the largest and busiest of the three main railway stations in Birmingham city centre, England, and a central hub of the British railway system. The three-letter station code is BHM.

The station is named after New Street, which runs parallel to the station, although the station has never had a direct entrance except via the Grand Central shopping centre. Historically, the main entrance to the station was on Stephenson Street, just off New Street. As of 2022, the station has entrances on Stephenson Street, Smallbrook Queensway, Hill Street and Navigation Street.

New Street is the fifth busiest railway station in the UK and the busiest outside London, with 46.5 million passenger entries and exits between April 2019 and March 2020. It is also the busiest interchange station outside London, with just over 7 million passengers changing trains at the station annually. In 2018, New Street had a passenger satisfaction rating of 92%, the third highest in the UK.

The original New Street station opened in 1854. At the time of its construction, the station had the largest single-span arched roof in the world. In the 1960s, the station was completely rebuilt. An enclosed station, with buildings over most of its span and passenger numbers more than twice those it was designed for, the replacement was not popular with its users. A £550m redevelopment of the station named Gateway Plus opened in September 2015; it includes a new concourse, a new exterior facade and a new entrance on Stephenson Street.

History

The first railway stations

New Street station was built in central Birmingham by the London and North Western Railway (LNWR) between 1846 and 1854, on the site of several streets in a marshy area known as "The Froggery"; it replaced several earlier rail termini on the outskirts of the centre, most notably Curzon Street, which had opened in 1838 and was no longer adequate for the level of traffic. Samuel Carter, solicitor to both LNWR and the Midland Railway, managed the conveyancing.

The LNWR originally shared the station with the Midland Railway; however, in 1885, the Midland Railway opened its own extension alongside the original station for the exclusive use of its trains, effectively creating two stations side by side. The two companies' stations were separated by a central roadway, Queens Drive.  Traffic grew steadily and, by 1900, New Street had an average of 40 trains an hour departing and arriving, rising to 53 trains in the peak hours.

Original LNWR station

The Countess of Huntingdon's Connexion chapel, on the corner of Peck Lane and Dudley Street, which had only been built six years before, was also demolished. The station was formally opened on 1 June 1854, although the uncompleted station had already been in use for two years as a terminus for trains from the Stour Valley Line, which entered the station from the Wolverhampton direction. On the formal opening day, the LNWR's Curzon Street station was closed to regular passenger services and trains from the London direction started using New Street.

The station was constructed by Messrs. Fox, Henderson & Co. and designed by Edward Alfred Cowper of that firm, who had previously worked on the design of the Crystal Palace. It held this title for 14 years until St Pancras station opened in 1868. It was originally intended to have three spans, supported by columns; however, it was soon realised that the supporting columns would severely restrict the workings of the railway. Cowper's single-span design, was therefore adopted, even though it was some 62 feet (19 metres) wider than the widest roof span at that time. George Gilbert Scott praised Cowper's roof at New Street, stating "An iron roof in its most normal condition is too spider-like a structure to be handsome, but with a very little attention this defect is obviated. The most wonderful specimen, probably, is that at the great Birmingham Station…" When first opened, New Street was described as the "Grand Central Station at Birmingham" by Richard Foster.

The internal layout of tracks and platforms was designed by Robert Stephenson and his assistants; the station contained a total of nine platforms, comprising four through and five bay platforms. The main entrance building on Stephenson Street incorporated Queens Hotel, designed by John William Livock, which was opened on the same day. It was built in an Italianate style and was originally provided with 60 rooms. The hotel was expanded several times over the years and reached its final form in 1917, with the addition of a new west wing.

The scale of the station at this time can be taken from the station's entry in the 1863 edition of Bradshaw's Guide:

The roof of the original station was strengthened with additional steel tie bars during 1906–07, as a precaution following the collapse of a similar roof which killed six people at Charing Cross station in 1905.

Midland Railway extension

Midland Railway trains that had used Curzon Street began to use New Street from 1854; however, its use by the Midland Railway was limited by the fact that those trains going between Derby and Bristol would have to reverse, so many trains bypassed New Street and ran through Camp Hill. This was remedied in 1885, when a new link to the south, the Birmingham West Suburban Railway, was extended into New Street, which allowed through trains to and from the south-west to run via New Street without reversing.

To cope with the increase in traffic that this would bring, the station required an extension, the construction of which began in 1881. A number of buildings, mostly along Dudley Street, were demolished to make room for it, including a number of cottages, some business premises and a small church. Built immediately to the south of the original station, the extension contained four through platforms and one bay. It was designed by Francis Stevenson, chief engineer to the LNWR. The extension was opened on 8 February 1885.

In early 1885, the number of daily users of the station was surveyed. On a Thursday, the number was 22,452 and on a Saturday it was 25,334.

Initially, the extension was used by both the LNWR and Midland Railway but, from 1889, it was only used by Midland Railway trains. It was separated from the original LNWR trainshed by Queens Drive, which became a central carriageway, but the two were linked by a footbridge which ran over Queens Drive and across the entire width of both the LNWR and Midland stations. Queens Drive was lost in the 1960s rebuild, but the name was later carried by a new driveway, which served the car park and a tower block, and is the access route for the station's taxis.

On 1 February 1910, the LNWR introduced a "City to City" service between New Street and Broad Street, in the City of London. The service only lasted for five years, before being withdrawn on 22 February 1915, as a result of World War I.

LMS and British Rail

In 1923, the LNWR and Midland Railway, with others, were grouped into the London, Midland and Scottish Railway (LMS) by the Railways Act 1921. In 1948, the railways were nationalised and came under the control of British Railways.

During World War II, Cowper's roof sustained extensive bomb damage as a result of air raids during the Birmingham Blitz. After the war, the remains of the roof were dismantled after being deemed beyond economic repair. It was replaced with austere canopies over the platforms, made from surplus war materials, which remained in use until the station was rebuilt in the 1960s.

1960s rebuild
The station was completely rebuilt in the 1960s, as part of the modernisation programme for the West Coast Main Line. Demolition of the old station and Queens Hotel began in 1964 and was not completed until 1966. The rebuilt New Street station was opened on 6 March 1967 to coincide with the introduction of electric expresses on the West Coast Main Line. It cost £4.5 million to build.

The new station was designed by Kenneth J. Davies, lead planner for British Rail London Midland Region. Twelve through platforms replaced the eight through and six bay platforms of the previous station. The platforms were covered over by a  concrete deck, supported by 200 columns, upon which the concourse and other buildings were constructed. Escalators, stairs and lifts were provided to reach the platforms from the concourse. The new station had sold its air rights, leading to the construction of the Pallasades Shopping Centre (then known as the Birmingham Shopping Centre) above the station between 1968 and 1970. The public right of way across the station, which had previously been maintained by the station footbridge, was retained in the new station via a winding route through the shopping centre. The station and the Pallasades were partly integrated with the Bullring Shopping Centre via elevated walkways above Smallbrook Queensway.

Also above the station was a nine-storey office block called Ladywood House, and a multi-storey car park dating from the 1970s. The car park closed in May 2012; it was demolished to provide space for the new concourse and was rebuilt. Stephenson Tower, a 20-storey residential tower block, was built alongside the station between 1965 and 1966. The tower, designed by the City Architect of Birmingham, was demolished in March 2012 as part of the station redevelopment.

In 1987, twelve different horse sculptures by Kevin Atherton, titled Iron Horse, were erected between New Street station and Wolverhampton at a cost of £12,000. One stands on platform 7 at New Street.

Due to its enclosed sub-surface platforms, New Street was designated as an underground station by the fire service. In the 1990s, a number of changes had to be made to the station in order to comply with stricter fire regulations, introduced for underground stations as a result of the 1987 King's Cross fire. In 1993, a new enclosed footbridge was opened at the Wolverhampton end of the station, with access to the platforms separate from the main building; this was built primarily as a fire exit, but the new exit from the station into Navigation Street was opened to the public. All wooden fittings were removed from the platforms and new fire doors were also installed at the foot of the stairs and elevators on the platforms.

The concrete constructed design of the 1960s station was widely criticised for being ugly. An enclosed station, with buildings over most of its span and passenger numbers more than twice that for which it was designed, by 2007 it was not popular with its users, having a customer satisfaction rate of only 52%, the joint lowest of any Network Rail major station.

New Street signal box

The power signal box at New Street was completed in 1964 on the site of the former turntable, housing the Westpac Geographical Interlocking & Signalmens push button control panel (the largest relay interlocking in the world when installed) and also the Railway Telephone Exchange. It is a brutalist building with corrugated concrete architecture, designed by John Bicknell and Paul Hamilton in collaboration with William Robert Headley, the regional architect for British Railways London Midland Region. The eight-level structure with five main storeys, including track & street levels and cable chamber below track level, is at the side of the tracks connected to Navigation Street. As of 2020, it is a Grade II-listed building. Until recently, two small sidings (nos. 2 & 3 Engine Sidings) were located in front of the signal box which were used for stabling electric locomotives in connection with locomotive changes from diesel to electric traction on XC services heading north. As they are no longer needed, these have now been removed in connection with the ongoing resignalling project for the station area. No. 1 Engine Siding was located at the north end, between platforms 4 and 5, and was lengthened some years ago to form platform 4C.

Don's Miniature New Street
A Sutton Coldfield model railway enthusiast, Don Jones, built a scale model of the entire 1960s station and surrounding buildings including the Rotunda, the old Head Post Office and the signal box, at OO scale; open days were held to raise funds for local charities. Private visits were held for Robert Redford and King Hussein of Jordan and locomotive owner Jeremy Hosking visited whilst a pupil at Rugby School.

2010–2015 redevelopment

In November 2003, the station was voted the second biggest "eyesore" in the UK by readers of Country Life magazine. This is because of the sub-surface nature of the station and the 1960s architecture. In 2007, New Street was voted joint worst station for customer satisfaction with Liverpool Lime Street and East Croydon, with only 52% satisfied; the national average was 60%.

The 1960s station also had become inadequate for the level of traffic with which it was dealing; it had been designed with capacity for 650 trains and 60,000 passengers per day. In 2008, there were 1,350 trains and over 120,000 passengers per day. By 2013, it was 140,000 passengers per day. This made overcrowding and closures on safety grounds more common.

A feasibility study into the redevelopment of the station was approved in January 2005. Designs were shown to the public in February 2006 for a new Birmingham New Street Station, in a project known as Gateway Plus.

A regeneration scheme was launched in 2006 and evolved through names such as Birmingham Gateway, Gateway Plus and New Street Gateway. The scheme proposed complete rebuilding of the street-level buildings and refurbishment of the platforms by 2013, with track and platform level remaining essentially unchanged.

The approved planning application of August 2006 showed a glass facade with rounded edges. Due to the economic slowdown, the "twin towers" plan was shelved.

In February 2008, the Secretary of State for Transport, Ruth Kelly, announced that the Department for Transport would provide £160 million in addition to £128 million through the government white paper Delivering a Sustainable Railway. A further £100 million came from the Department for Business, Enterprise and Regulatory Reform and channelled through Advantage West Midlands, the regional development agency. The announcement brought total government spending on the project to £388 million. After earlier proposals were discarded, six architects were shortlisted to design the new station following a call for submissions  and it was announced, in September 2008, that the design by Foreign Office Architects had been chosen.

The approved plans for the redevelopment included:
A new concourse three-and-a-half times larger than the 1960s concourse, with a domed atrium at the centre to let in natural light.
Refurbished platforms reached by new escalators and lifts.
A new station facade and new entrances.

The fact that the proposed Gateway development would leave the railway capacity of the station more or less unaltered has not escaped attention. In July 2008, the House of Commons Transport Committee criticised the plans; it was not convinced they were adequate for the number of trains which could use the station. It said if the station could not be adapted, then the government needed to look for alternative solutions which potentially included a completely new station in the city.

Work began on the redevelopment on 26 April 2010. Construction was completed in phases to minimise disruption. On 28 April 2013, one half of the new concourse was opened to the public and the old 1960s concourse was closed for redevelopment, along with the old entrances. The complete concourse opened on 20 September 2015, the Grand Central shopping centre four days later. The refurbished Pallasades Shopping Centre was renamed Grand Central and included a John Lewis department store. During heavy winds on 30 December 2015, several roof tiles blew off, landing in the adjacent Station Street, which was therefore closed by the police as a precautionary measure.

Station masters

Robert Wyatt ca. 1862–1867
Mr. Hyatt 1867–????
John Roberts 1875–1884 (formerly station master at Huddersfield)
Thomas Wood 1884–1885 (formerly station master at London Road, Manchester)
John Wynne 1885–1892
John Squires 1892–1908
W. Cresswell 1908–1919
George Hadfield 1919–1934
Joseph Harrison 1934–1937 (formerly station master at Southport, afterwards station master at London Euston)
F.G. Hewitt 1937–1943 (formerly station master at Sheffield, afterwards station master at London St Pancras)
Thomas Finch 1943–1949 (formerly station master at Watford Junction)
W.H. Price 1949–1959
Raymond E. Hardy 1959–1962 (formerly station master at Norwich, afterwards station master at Newcastle upon Tyne)
Major Cecil Henry Swancutt 1962–1964

Operations
Around 80% of train services to Birmingham go through New Street.

Railway operations
New Street is the hub of the West Midlands rail network, as well as being a major national hub. The station is one of twenty operated and managed by Network Rail. Network Rail also provides operational staff for the station.

Station staff are provided on all platforms to assist with the safe dispatch of trains. For operational reasons, all trains departing New Street much be dispatched via the use of Right Away (RA) indicators. They display a signal informing the train driver it is safe to start the train, instead of using more traditional bell or hand signals.

The twelve through platforms are divided into a and b ends, with an extra bay platform called 4c between 4b and 5b, with the b end of the station towards Wolverhampton; this, in effect, allows twice the number of platforms. Longer trains that are too long for one section of the platform occupy the entire length of the platform, such as Class 390 or HSTs.

Trains departing towards Proof House Junction (a end) can depart from any platform, but there are restrictions on trains departing from the b end. All platforms can accommodate trains heading towards Wolverhampton; however, due to the platform layout and road bridge supports, only 5–12 can accommodate trains heading towards Five Ways. There are a number of sidings on the station for the stabling of trains; these are between platforms 5/6, 7/8 and 9/10. The bay platforms at either end of platform 12 were removed during the 2015 refurbishment. The sidings in front of New Street signal box have also been removed.

Still in existence, but out of use, is the "Royal Mail tunnel" which connected the "b" end of the station platforms to the former sorting office (now called The Mailbox) alongside Suffolk Street. The tunnel to the former Head Post Office at Victoria Square is bricked up, with the subway between the platforms remaining in use for railway staff. The former baggage subway at the "a" end is now used for railway staff and as a fire exit.

All signalling is controlled by New Street power signal box at the Wolverhampton or b end of the station; it can be seen at street level on Navigation Street. The station is allocated the IATA location identifier QQN.

Approach tunnels
All trains arriving and departing must use one of the several tunnels around the station.

Stour Valley Line Tunnel – heads westwards towards Soho Junction & Wolverhampton and passes under the National Indoor Arena. The former was opened in 1852, as part of the Stour Valley Line, and holds two tracks.
This tunnel opened in 1854 and originally held two tracks; it was widened in 1896 to hold four tracks, with two double-track parallel bores.
Gloucester Line Tunnels – a series of four consecutive, separate tunnels heading south-west towards Five Ways. These tunnels opened in 1885 as part of the Birmingham West Suburban Railway and hold two tracks.

Customer service and ticketing
Network Rail, as well as operating the station, operate a customer reception located on the main concourse, provide mobility assistance and train dispatch. The booking office and barriers are operated by Avanti West Coast, with customer service or floor walker staff provided by CrossCountry and Network Rail. Avanti West Coast operates a first class lounge and Network West Midlands also provides a public transport information point for the station.

The station is a penalty fare station for West Midlands Railway and London Northwestern Railway (West Midlands Trains' brands). This scheme is operated both onboard trains and at the automatic ticket barriers at the station. The other train operating companies that use the station do not operate penalty fare schemes.

Pollution and air quality concerns
The station is designated as underground. There were extractor fans that removed fumes, but these were removed with the refurbishment of the concourse and shopping centre above the platforms. They were replaced with blowers, as there are still a large number of services operated by diesel trains despite the whole station having been electrified in the 1960s. There have been environmental concerns about the level of pollution, especially NOx, in the station.

Train operating companies
Since the privatisation of British Rail, there have been thirteen train companies that have regularly called at New Street: 
Arriva Trains Wales, Avanti West Coast, Central Trains, CrossCountry, First North Western, London Midland, Silverlink, Virgin CrossCountry, Virgin Trains West Coast, Transport for Wales, Wales & Borders, Wales & West and West Midlands Trains.

Currently Avanti West Coast, CrossCountry, Transport for Wales and West Midlands Trains provide services from New Street; Chiltern Railways have occasionally used New Street during engineering works.

West Midlands Trains operates a traincrew depot at the station and stables some trains overnight around the station. For the most part, they use Soho TMD for electric traction units, with its non-electric units kept at Tyseley TMD to the south-east of Birmingham.

CrossCountry also operates a traincrew depot at the station; it uses Tyseley TMD for the Class 170 units and its Voyagers are based at Central Rivers TMD.

Train services

The basic Monday to Saturday off-peak service in trains per hour (tph) is as follows:

Avanti West Coast
 2tph to London Euston (1 via Rugby and Watford Junction, and 1 via Milton Keynes Central). All trains call at Birmingham International and Coventry.
 1tpd to Shrewsbury

CrossCountry
 2tph to  via .
 1tph to  via , of which 1tp2h continues to Bournemouth via Southampton Central.
 2tph to Leicester of which 1 continues to Stansted Airport via Peterborough. 

West Midlands Trains
 2tph to 
 2tph to 
 2tph to 
 2tph to  via Four Oaks
 2tph to 
 2tph to 
 2tph to 
 1tph to  via  & 
 1tph to 
 1tph to  via 
 1tph to  via 
 1tph to  via  & 
 1tph to  via 

Transport for Wales
 1tph to 

COVID-19 travel restrictions introduced in 2020 resulted in a reduction in normal service patterns. For example, from December 2020 there is no direct service to Paignton and the service to Bristol Temple Meads is reduced to hourly.

Transport links

West Midlands Metro

New Street is served by the West Midlands Metro tram system from the adjacent Grand Central tram stop outside the station's main entrance on Stephenson Street. This opened on 30 May 2016, when the city centre extension of the Metro came into operation. The stop was temporarily, before extension to Broad Street, a terminus of West Midlands Metro Line One, and provides a link to Snow Hill station and onwards to Wolverhampton.

Initially, Grand Central was planned to act as the terminus of the city centre extension. However, it was later decided that further extension would take place towards Centenary Square and later to Edgbaston, this extension opened in mid 2022.

Links to Moor Street and Snow Hill stations
There is a signposted route for passengers travelling between New Street and Moor Street stations which involves a short walk through a bus tunnel under the Bullring shopping centre. Although the railway lines into New Street pass directly underneath Moor Street station, there is no rail connection. In 2013 a new direct walkway was opened between the two stations.

Accidents and incidents

 On 7 November 1850 the engine of a goods train which was leaving the station was derailed by an explosion caused by leaking gas from a gas-lighting main, which came into contact with its firebox. There were no casualties, but the abutment of the viaduct on which the explosion occurred was destroyed by the blast.
 On 18 April 1877 the south tunnel was blocked by an overturned locomotive.
 On 26 November 1921, a serious accident occurred on the Midland half of New Street station, when an express from Bristol crashed into the rear of a stationary train to Derby, which was standing at platform four and had been delayed due to engine trouble. The collision caused the guards van of the Derby train to telescope with the rear coach. Three people were killed, and twenty four injured. The later inquest ruled that the express had overrun the danger signal due to driver error, and the misty conditions had made the rails moist, leading to wheelslip when the driver applied the brakes.

See also

 Transport in Birmingham
 Transport for West Midlands
 Commuter rail in the United Kingdom

References

Further reading

 Foster, Richard, Birmingham New Street. The Story of a Great Station Including Curzon Street. 1 Background and Beginnings. The Years up to 1860. Wild Swan Publications, 1990. 
 Foster, Richard, Birmingham New Street. The Story of a Great Station Including Curzon Street. 2 Expansion and Improvement. 1860 to 1923. Wild Swan Publications, 1990. 
 Foster, Richard, Birmingham New Street. The Story of a Great Station Including Curzon Street. 3 LMS Days. 1923-1947. Wild Swan Publications, 1997. 
 Foster, Richard, Birmingham New Street. The Story of a Great Station Including Curzon Street. 4 British Railways. The First 15 Years. Wild Swan Publications. (Not yet published).

 Norton, Mark, Birmingham New Street Station Through Time. Amberley, 2013. .
 Smith, Donald J., New Street Remembered: The story of Birmingham's New Street Station 1854-1967 in words and pictures. Barbryn Press, 1984.  .
 Upton, Chris, A History of Birmingham, Phillimore 1997. .

External links

New Street - New Start
Birmingham New Street, on Warwickshire Railways Photographs and information on the Victorian Station. 
1890 Ordnance Survey map of the station
Rail Around Birmingham and the West Midlands: Birmingham New Street station
Building a model of Birmingham New Street station
1967 ATV report on station rebuilding and opening
1994 video of Don's Miniature New Street

Former London and North Western Railway stations
Former Midland Railway stations
Network Rail managed stations
Transit centers in the United Kingdom
Railway stations in Birmingham, West Midlands
Railway stations in Great Britain opened in 1854
Railway stations served by CrossCountry
Railway stations served by Transport for Wales Rail
Railway stations served by Avanti West Coast
Railway stations served by West Midlands Trains
1854 establishments in England
DfT Category A stations
Stations on the West Coast Main Line